John Flanagan (born July 17, 1975 in Honolulu) is a male freestyle swimmer from United States. He represented his native country at the 1998 World Aquatics Championships in Perth, Western Australia, competing in one individual event (5 km). He has also competed in numerous Ironman competitions, including the Ironman World Championship in Kona, HI, where in 2009 he finished first place during the swim portion of the race.

Since 2001, John has been head swim coach at Kamehameha Swim Club in Honolulu, along with his brother Kevin Flanagan, where they have won the last 31 Hawaii State Championships.

References
USA Swimming

1975 births
Living people
American male freestyle swimmers
American male triathletes
American long-distance swimmers
World Aquatics Championships medalists in open water swimming